Local elections were held in Kosovo on 15 November and 13 December 2009. These were the first local elections to be held after Kosovo declared independence in February 2008. The elections were to elect mayors and municipal councils in 36 municipalities, and were contested by 37 ethnic Albanian parties and 21 Serbian lists. All citizens with a valid ID were able to vote in the elections.

Pieter Feith, the European Union Special Representative  in Kosovo, declared before the election that he expected the elections to "pass the democratic test".

The elections were still unfinished two months after starting. Many cities recounted votes or ordered fresh voting.

Prizren and Lipljan held their elections on 31 January 2009.

These elections resulted in Democratic Party of Kosovo control over the majority of local positions.

Results

Mitrovica District

Mitrovica

Skenderaj

Vushtrri

Unrecognized results in predominantly Serb communities
The Serb community in northern Kosovo generally boycotted the 2009 local elections. Although elections were formally held and results certified for Leposavić, Zubin Potok, and Zvečan, the turnouts were extremely low, the outcomes were not recognized internationally or in the communities in question, and the winning candidates never took power.

Leposavić

Note: The nine candidates who were formally elected were the only candidates on the ballot. There were nineteen seats in the assembly.

Zubin Potok

Note: There was only one candidate on the Democratic Party of Kosovo's list.

Zvečan

Note: There were only two candidates on the Alliance for the Future of Kosovo's list. There were nineteen seats in the assembly.

References

2009
2009 in Kosovo
2009 elections in Europe
December 2009 events in Europe